Darıdere Dam is a dam in Turkey. The development was backed by the Turkish State Hydraulic Works.

See also
List of dams and reservoirs in Turkey

External links
DSI directory, State Hydraulic Works (Turkey), Retrieved December 16, 2009

Dams in Bilecik Province